Francisco María Susoni Abreu (September 11, 1875 – November 28, 1954) was a Puerto Rican politician and senator. He was a member of the first Puerto Rican Senate formed in 1917, representing the District of Arecibo. He returned to politics in the 1940s, and was elected again as senator for the Popular Democratic Party (PPD). Dr. Susoni was the first candidate for governor of the Puerto Rican Independence Party in 1948, political party founded in 1946 in spite of all the obstacles imposed by the colonial establishment.

Biography
Francisco Susoni Abreu was born in Hatillo, Puerto Rico on September 11, 1875. He studied medicine at University of Santiago de Compostela in Spain, graduating in 1899.

In 1917, Susoni was elected to the first Puerto Rican Senate, representing the District of Arecibo for the Union of Puerto Rico party.

Susoni was part of the Board of the Union party, but he parted ways with it in 1929 when the party joined the Republican Party. In 1932, he joined the Liberal Party of Puerto Rico, but in 1936 he joined the faction led by Luis Muñoz Marín demanding independence to the island.

Susoni was participant in the founding of the Popular Democratic Party in 1938 and was reelected to the Senate of Puerto Rico in 1940. He served as its President pro tempore from 1941 to 1944. He was reelected in 1944, but was asked by his party to join the Puerto Rico House of Representatives instead. Susoni served as Speaker of the House in 1945.

Due to differences with the leadership, Susoni resigned to his seat on June 5, 1948 and joined the New Independence Party. He was their candidate for Governor at the 1948 general elections.

Susoni died on November 28, 1954 in Arecibo, Puerto Rico.

See also

List of Puerto Ricans

References

External links
Biografía de Francisco Susoni Abreu

1875 births
Members of the Senate of Puerto Rico
People from Hatillo, Puerto Rico
Presidents pro tempore of the Senate of Puerto Rico
1954 deaths
Speakers of the House of Representatives of Puerto Rico